Anne Shirley (born Dawn Evelyn Paris; April 17, 1918 – July 4, 1993) was an American actress.

Beginning her career as a child actress under the stage name Dawn O'Day, she adopted the stage name of Anne Shirley, after playing the title character in the film adaptation of Anne of Green Gables in 1934, after which she achieved a successful career in supporting roles. Among her films is Stella Dallas (1937), for which she was nominated for an Academy Award for Best Supporting Actress.

Although Shirley left the acting profession in 1944, at the age of 26, she remained in Los Angeles, where she died at the age of 75.

Early life
Born in New York City, as a baby she began modeling, and made her film debut with a featured role in 1922's Moonshine Valley. Shirley began acting at the age of five as the live action "Alice" in Walt Disney's pre-Mickey Mouse silent animated series "Alice in Cartoonland". She had a highly successful child star career in Pre-Code movies, appearing in films such as Liliom, Tom Mix's Riders of the Purple Sage, So Big, Three on a Match and Rasputin and the Empress.

Career

In 1934, she starred as the character of Anne Shirley in Anne of Green Gables and took that character's name as her legal and stage name.

After adopting the name Anne Shirley, she starred in Steamboat 'Round the Bend, Make Way for a Lady and Stella Dallas, for which she was nominated for the Academy Award for Best Supporting Actress.

Later roles were in Vigil in the Night, Anne of Windy Poplars, The Devil and Daniel Webster and Murder, My Sweet, her final film. Of Shirley's portrayal in Saturday's Children, The New York Times wrote that she "endows the little wife with heroic integrity and strength of character."

Personal life
Shirley married actor John Payne on August 22, 1937, in Montecito, California. They had a daughter, former actress Julie Payne, and divorced in 1943.

Her second husband was film producer and screenwriter Adrian Scott. When he was blacklisted and decided to move the family to Europe, she wrote a "Dear John" letter to him, stating she'd rather stay behind and divorce him, which she did in 1949.

Her third husband was Charles Lederer, nephew of Marion Davies.  They had a son, Daniel Lederer, before his death in 1976.

Shirley had brief relationships with younger western star Rory Calhoun and with French movie star Jean-Pierre Aumont.

Shirley died from lung cancer in Los Angeles, aged 75, on July 4, 1993, and was cremated. For her contributions to the motion picture industry, she has a star on the Hollywood Walk of Fame at 7020 Hollywood Blvd.

Filmography

References

External links

Anne Shirley at the AFI Catalog of Feature Films
Anne Shirley at the Turner Classic Movies database
Anne Shirley at AllMovie
Anne Shirley at Virtual History

American child actresses
American film actresses
Deaths from lung cancer in California
Actresses from New York City
1918 births
1993 deaths
20th-century American actresses